Antoine Louis Ambroise Haller (30 December 1864 – 1 August 1929) was a French fencer. He competed in the individual foil masters and épée masters events at the 1900 Summer Olympics.

References

External links
 

1864 births
1929 deaths
French male épée fencers
French male foil fencers
Olympic fencers of France
Fencers at the 1900 Summer Olympics
Fencers from Paris